Ralph-Armand Beck (born 20 February 1966), known professionally as Taucher, is a German trance DJ. His name means "Diver" in German.

Taucher began spinning in 1992, initially collaborating with Torsten Stenzel (1993–2002). He quickly became one of the best-known spinners on the Frankfurt club scene.

His 1999 compilation album Life Is a Remix was a success, as was his Live at Webster Hall, New York City, which peaked at number 43 on the US Billboard Heatseekers chart in 2000. His 1999 single, "Child of the Universe", peaked at number 74 in the UK Singles Chart.

Discography

Studio albums

1996 - Return To Atlantis
2001 - Ebbe & Flut
2009 - Adult Music
2018 - Faces (with Tandu)

Singles and EPs

1993 – Atlantis
1994 - Fantasy
1995 - infinity
1996 - Waters
1996 - Miracle
1997 - Together (with Talla 2XLC)
1998 - Reach Out (with Mario De Bellis)
1999 - Bizarre/Child Of The Universe (Sanvean)
1999 - Nightshift (with Talla 2XLC)
2000 - Science Fiction
2000 - Pictures Of a Gallery
2002 - Millenium Bitch
2008 - Can't Wait (with Shane) (Part 1+2)
2009 - Just Like You (Part 1+2)
2009 - Mach Dich Mal Locker
2009 - Paris
2009 - Flow
2012 - The Rise Of The Phoenix (with Talla 2XLC)
2015 - Kings & Queens (with York & Ayla)
2015 - Free Yourself (with York & Ayla feat. Juno Im Park)
2018 - Skyarium (with Roger Shah)
2018 - Atlantis 2018 (with DJ Jo)
2018 - Konnection (with George Acosta)
2018 - Child Of The Universe 2018
2019 - Electric Dreams (with Talla 2XLC)

Vinyl and 12-inch

2003 - Patrick Scott & Taucher – Torched / Inexorable Lust
2003 - The More You Work The Better You Get
2004 - Taucher & Tandu Pres. Tantau – Mansonate
2004 - Taucher & Marc Vision Pres. ViTa – ViTa
2005 - Taucher & Zigon – Cuba Libre

Remixes (selected)

1996 - Scooter - I'm Raving (Taucher Remix)
1997 - Ayla - Ayla (DJ Taucher Remix)
1997 - Sosa - The Wave (DJ Taucher Remix)
1998 - Faithless - God is a DJ (Taucher Remix)
1998 - Blank & Jones - Flying To The Moon (Taucher Remix)
1998 - T2 - 8:15 To Nowhere (DJ Taucher Remix)
1999 - DJ Hitch Hiker Pres. Lunatic Asylum – Meltdown 2000 (DJ Taucher Remix)
1999 - Praga Khan - Injected With A Poison (DJ Taucher Mix)
2001 - York - Yesterday (Taucher Remix)
2003 - RMB - Your Love Is An Ocean (Taucher's Tribe Remix)

References

External links
Taucher at Discogs

Living people
German electronic musicians
German trance musicians
1966 births